The 2021–22 Tarleton State Texans women's basketball team represents Tarleton State University in the 2021–22 NCAA Division I women's basketball season. The Texans, led by eighth-year head coach Misty Wilson, play their home games at the Wisdom Gym in Stephenville, Texas, as members of the Western Athletic Conference.

The season marks Tarleton State's second year of a four-year transition period from Division II to Division I. As a result, the Texans are not eligible for NCAA postseason play and can not participate in the WAC tournament. They would be eligible to play in the CIT or CBI if invited.

Previous season

Roster

Schedule and results

|-
!colspan=12 style=| Non-conference regular season

|-
!colspan=12 style=| WAC conference season

|-

Source

See also
 2021–22 Tarleton State Texans men's basketball team

References

Tarleton State Texans women's basketball seasons
Tarleton State
Tarleton State Texans women's basketball
Tarleton State Texans women's basketball